Björn Rosendahl (born 16 November 1956) is a Swedish orienteering competitor. He is Relay World Champion from 1979, as a member of the Swedish winning team. He won the Swedish championships in relay with his club OK Ravinen in 1978, 1979 and 1980.

References

1956 births
Living people
Swedish orienteers
Male orienteers
Foot orienteers
World Orienteering Championships medalists